Marianella Bargilli (born February 27, 1971) is an Italian actress.

Television 
From May 2015 she plays the role of Rosaura in Il bugiardo of Goldoni, directed by Alfredo Arias. The show debuted at the Napoli Teatro Festival Italia in June 2015. In the same year she plays the role of Donata in fiction Baciato dal sole, directed by Antonello Grimaldi, aired from February 22, 2016 on Rai 1.

References 

1971 births
Living people
Italian television personalities
Italian actresses